This is a list of lighthouses in Friesland, province in the Netherlands. Five lighthouses are on the West Frisian Islands. Most of these lighthouses are subject to historic preservation. The lighthouses of Terschelling, Vlieland, Ameland and the red tower of Schiermonnikoog still function as lighthouses.

Lighthouses

 
Tourist attractions in Friesland
Lists of lighthouses in the Netherlands